The Biovision Hierarchy (BVH) character animation file format was developed by Biovision, a defunct motion capture services company, to give motion capture data to customers. This format largely displaced an earlier format Biovision providing skeleton hierarchy information as well as motion data.

As of 2019, BVH is widely used and most 3D applications support importing and exporting files in this format.

Examples of software using files in BVH format:

Lightwave 3D
3ds Max (version 9 or later)
Blender
Clara.io
Cobalt
Daz Studio
Esenthel Engine
Lifeforms
MakeHuman
Maya
Modo
Poser
Seamless3d Free open source modeller
Second Life / OpenSim
Avimator and its Qt port Qavimator
Maxon Cinema 4d
formZ
Milkshape 3D
Papervision 3D
OpenQwaq
Webots
Xsens

See also
 List of motion and gesture file formats

Animation software
Computer file formats